Millions on the Island (Milioni na otoku) is a 1955 Croatian film directed by Branko Bauer.

References

External links
 

1955 films
1950s Croatian-language films
Yugoslav children's films
Films directed by Branko Bauer
Jadran Film films
Croatian children's films
1950s children's adventure films
Croatian black-and-white films
Yugoslav black-and-white films
Films set in Yugoslavia
Films set in Croatia